Three Black Angels (Spanish: Tres angelitos negros) is a 1960 Mexican comedy film directed by Fernando Cortés and starring Miguel Aceves Mejía, Yolanda Varela and Pedro Vargas.

Cast
 Miguel Aceves Mejía as Ángel Reynosa  
 Yolanda Varela as Catalina  
 Pedro Vargas as Señor cura  
 Óscar Pulido as Tomás 
 Rodolfo Landa as Alonso 
 Óscar Ortiz de Pinedo as Don Óscar  
 José Pardavé as Matias Galván  
 Rafael Estrada 
 Enedina Díaz de León as Doña Perfecta, ama de llaves  
 Francisco Reiguera as Doctor  
 Carmen Romano
 Américo Caggiano
 Marujita Díaz as Maruja

References

Bibliography 
 María Luisa Amador & Jorge Ayala Blanco. Cartelera cinematográfica, 1960-1969. Centro Universitario de Estudios Cinematográficos, 1986.

External links 
 

1960 films
1960 comedy films
Mexican comedy films
1960s Spanish-language films
Films directed by Fernando Cortés
Films scored by Manuel Esperón
1960s Mexican films